The Micronesia black skink (Emoia arnoensis) is a species of lizard in the family Scincidae. It is found in Micronesia, likely limited within the Marshall Islands, Nauru, and Kosrae. There is debate on whether the Nauru population is a subspecies, due to its larger amount of middorsal scales.

Habitat 
E. arnoensis is strongly terrestrial, typically in thickly weeded or vine covered open habitats.

References

Emoia
Reptiles described in 1953
Taxa named by Walter Creighton Brown
Taxa named by Joe T. Marshall